The Mayor of Las Anod is the chief executive of the city of Las Anod, the capital of Sool region in Somaliland. The current mayor is Abdirahim Ali Ismail, who took office on 20 June 2021.

List of mayors

See also
 Mayor of Berbera
 Mayor of Burao
 Mayor of Borama
 Mayor of Hargeisa
 Mayor of Erigavo

References

Mayors of places in Somaliland